3340 or variant, may refer to:

In general
 A.D. 3340, a year in the 4th millennium CE
 3340 BC, a year in the 4th millennium BCE
 3340, a number in the 3000 (number) range

Other uses
 3340 Yinhai, an asteroid in the Asteroid Belt, the 3340th asteroid registered
 IBM 3340, a hard disk drive
 Texas Farm to Market Road 3340, a state highway

See also